The Marquesas Keys form an uninhabited island group about  west of Key West,  in diameter, and largely covered by mangrove forest. They are an unincorporated area of Monroe County, Florida and belong to the Lower Keys Census County Division. They are protected as part of the Key West National Wildlife Refuge. The Marquesas were used for target practice by the military as recently as 1980.

The total area, including the lagoon, measures . The group is located at coordinates .

The central lagoon is called Mooney Harbor. The northernmost key is the largest and has a strip of sandy beach free of mangrove. In the past it was known as "Entrance Key". It surrounds the lagoon in the north and east. Adjoining in the south are smaller keys such as Gull Keys, Mooney Harbor Key, and finally about four unnamed keys in the southwest corner of the group.  Older charts show that two of these keys once were named "Button Island" and "Round Island".

 west of the Marquesas Keys is Rebecca Shoal.

While the islands are uninhabited by humans, rays, sharks, sea turtles, and bird life abound. The Florida Keys National Marine Sanctuary has designated no-motor and no-access areas to protect nesting, feeding, and roosting birds and nesting turtles.

The islands are best known for their excellent sport fishing.

See also
 Key West National Wildlife Refuge
 Pseudo-atoll

References

External links

 Key Names: A Gazeteer of the Islands of the Florida Keys

Uninhabited islands of Monroe County, Florida
Lagoons of Florida
Beaches of Monroe County, Florida
Islands of the Florida Keys
Beaches of Florida
Islands of Florida